Soul Kitchen may refer to:
Soul Kitchen (film), a 2009 film directed by Fatih Akın
 "Soul Kitchen" (song), a 1967 song by The Doors from their self-titled debut album The Doors
JBJ Soul Kitchen, a self-help restaurant run by Jon Bon Jovi in New Jersey
Soul Kitchen, a 2006 novel by Poppy Z. Brite, part of the Liquor novel series